Shivani Tomar is an Indian actress who mainly works in Hindi television. She made her acting debut in 2012 with Gumrah: End of Innocence. She is best known for her portrayal of Shakti Rai in Friends: Conditions Apply, Chandni Narayan in Iss Pyaar Ko Kya Naam Doon 3, Kanchan in Mitegi Laxman Rekha and Dr. Agni Awasthi in Agni Vayu.

Early life
Tomar was born and brought up in New Delhi. She did a commercial art course from an institute in Lajpat Nagar, Delhi.

Career

Tomar made her acting debut in 2012 with an episode of Gumrah: End of Innocence. In 2013, she portrayed Ruchita Karanjkar in Pavitra Rishta and Meenal Kashyap in Crazy Stupid Ishq. She then portrayed Swati from in Iss Pyaar Ko Kya Naam Doon? Ek Baar Phir.

From 2014 to 2015, she portrayed Shakti Rai in Friends: Conditions Apply. She portrayed Shakti Gupta in Hum Aapke Ghar Mein Rehte Hain in 2015 and Tanuja Sikand in Kasam Tere Pyaar Ki in 2016.

Tomar's portrayal of Chandni Narayan Vashishth in Iss Pyaar Ko Kya Naam Doon 3 in 2017, marked a turning point in her career. She then appeared in Vani Rani.

In 2018, she portrayed Kanchan in Mitegi Laxman Rekha and in 2021, she portrayed Dr. Agni Awasthi in Agni Vayu. In 2022, she made her web debut with Mr Aur Mrs LLB portraying Advocate Payal Agarwal.

Television

Television

Web series

Music videos

References

External links

 

21st-century Indian actresses
Living people
Indian television actresses
Year of birth missing (living people)